Sphaerolejeunea is a genus of liverwort in family Lejeuneaceae. It contains the following species (but this list may be incomplete):
 Sphaerolejeunea umbilicata, Herzog

References 

Porellales genera
Lejeuneaceae
Taxonomy articles created by Polbot